Fatma Fikret Şeneş (1921 – 16 February 2015) was the first Turkish female songwriter. By writing over 290 songs, she hugely contributed to the Turkish pop music. Her songs attracted great interest.

Career 
In the mid-1950s, Fikret Şeneş, who was in her early 30s, wrote her first lyrics for Erol Büyükburç, took vocal lessons and played the piano. In the late 1960s, "İki Yabancı" became the first Turkish song written by Şeneş. She then wrote hundreds of songs for popular artists in Turkey.

Personal life 
Fikret Şeneş's mother, Calibe, together with her husband chose their surname Şeneş as the Surname Law was enforced in Turkey. After graduating from the American College for Girls in Istanbul, Fikret Şeneş enrolled in the singing department of the conservatory and left without finishing the conservatory. She was married to Bedii Bey for 18 years.

Şeneş who was treated for Alzheimer's disease died on 16 February 2015. Şenes's body was buried at the Zincirlikuyu Cemetery.

Songs

References

External links 

Fikret Şeneş biography, Milliyet

1921 births
2015 deaths
Burials at Zincirlikuyu Cemetery
Turkish songwriters